von Berg in aristocratic German name hailing from the Duchy of Berg. It may refer to:

 Rulers of the Duchy of Berg
 Bruno II von Berg (c. 1100–1137), Archbishop of Cologne
 Carl Heinrich Edmund von Berg (1800–1874), German forestry scientist
 Friedrich Wilhelm Rembert von Berg (1793–1874) Governor-General of Finland, Namestnik of Kingdom of Poland
 Henning von Berg (born 10 June 1961), German photographer
 Karoline Friederike von Berg (1760–1826), German salonist and lady in waiting
 Marquard von Berg (1528–1591), Prince-Bishop of Augsburg 
 Otto II (bishop of Freising) (died 17 March 1220), sometimes called Otto von Berg, Bishop of Freising
 Shaun von Berg (born 16 September 1986), South African cricketer.
 Wilfred Clement Von Berg (1894–1978), British architect 
 Dr Gunther Heinrich Baron von Berg (1765–1843) Legislator, Statesman, Privy Councillor. 
 Karl Heinrich Ernst Baron von Berg (1810–1894) Minister of State Grand Duchy of Oldenburg 
 Gustav Hans Dietrich Baron von Berg (1853–1908) Maj Gen Prussia. Commander 2nd Infantry Brigade.
 Gunther Hans Dietrich Baron von Berg (1841–1917) Forest Master Alsace Lorraine.  

Surnames of German origin